Legionella fallonii is a Gram-negative, catalase-positive, weakly oxidase-positive bacterium from the genus Legionella which was isolated from a ship air-conditioning system.

References

External links
Type strain of Legionella fallonii at BacDive -  the Bacterial Diversity Metadatabase

Legionellales
Bacteria described in 2001